Joseph Kemp Toole (May 12, 1851 – March 11, 1929) was a Democratic politician from Montana. He served as the first and fourth Governor of Montana.

Biography
Toole was born in Savannah, Missouri and attended public school in St. Joseph, Missouri. In 1868, he graduated from the Western Military Institute in New Castle, Kentucky with honors. He moved to Helena, Montana in 1870; studied law and was admitted to the bar in 1871 and commenced practice in Helena. Toole was district attorney of the third judicial district of Montana (1872–1876), and a member of the Montana Territorial House of Representatives (1879-1881), and member and president of the Montana Territorial Council (1881–1883). He married Lily Rosecrans, daughter of General William Rosecrans, in 1890 and they had three children.

Career
Toole was a delegate to the State Constitutional Convention at Helena in 1884 and 1889, and elected as a Democrat to the Forty-ninth and Fiftieth Congresses (March 4, 1885 – March 3, 1889); he did not seek renomination in 1888.

Toole was the first Governor of Montana (the only Democrat on the ticket that year to be elected), serving from November 8, 1889, until January 1, 1893. He resumed practice of law in Helena. Toole was a delegate to the Democratic National Conventions in 1892 and 1904.

He served as the fourth Governor of Montana from January 7, 1901 until April 1, 1908, when he resigned because of ill health. During his tenure, county treasurers were authorized to collect taxes on personal property, and there was legislation to ensure mine safety and mineworker protection.

Death
During retirement, Toole divided his time between his home in Helena and San Francisco, California, until his death on March 11, 1929, at the age of 77. He is interred at Resurrection Cemetery in Helena, Montana.

References

External links
 
National Governors Association
The Encyclopedia of Montana

1851 births
1929 deaths
People from Savannah, Missouri
Politicians from Helena, Montana
Politicians from San Francisco
Members of the Montana Territorial Legislature
19th-century American politicians
Democratic Party governors of Montana
Delegates to the United States House of Representatives from Montana Territory